The  2021 Superrace Championship  (commercially known as the 2021 CJ Logistics Superrace Championship) was a South Korean motor racing series for stock cars, production cars and prototypes. It was the 16th season running for the championship and the 15th season both partnered by CJ Group and raced under the moniker Superrace Championship. The championship was contested individually between 5 classes; Super 6000, Kumho GT, Cadillac CT4 Class, Kolon Motors (BMW) M Class  &  Radical Cup Korea.

Calendar

Mid-season calendar changes
The 3rd round of the championship held at Korea International Circuit was postponed due to the Korean government announcing measures to prevent COVID-19 from spreading across the country. As a result, the revised calendar included a double-header hosted at Korea International Circuit at the end of the season taking place on the 20th and 21st of November. The 3rd round took place at Inje Speedium, which also held the annual Gangwon International Motor Festa. The event was also held without spectators and with on-site quarantine in accordance with the government's plans to strengthen social distancing.

Teams and drivers

Samsung Fire & Marine Insurance 6000 
Since 2020, all teams are currently using the Toyota GR Supra powered with a General Motors 6.2L LS3 V8 engine capable of producing 460 horsepower.

Mid-season changes 
On August 26, series tire supplier Nexen Tire announced the arrival of a new racing team. Named 'N'Fera Racing', the team held a launch ceremony in Seoul and confirmed that they will debut at the 3rd round of the championship held at Inje Speedium, selecting Hwang Do-yun as their driver.

On November 5, ONE Racing announced that its main driver, Kwon Jae-in, will not contest the 5th and 6th rounds held at Everland Speedway due to personal reasons. As a result, Kumho GT1 drivers Jang Hyun-wook and Lim Min-jin replaced him for the weekend and raced the car on the 5th and 6th rounds respectively.

Kumho GT

Cadillac CT4

Kolon Motors BMW M

Season summary

Championship standings

Drivers championships

Scoring system

Super 6000 
Kim Jong-kyum won the Super 6000 title for the third time in his career, after winning back-to-back titles in 2018 and 2019. 

Notes:
 – Driver did not finish the round, but was classified as they completed more than 75% of the race distance.

Teams championships

Super 6000 
The teams championship is decided upon points scored by two drivers per team after each race. Teams with 3 or more drivers have 15 days before each race to select two drivers to add their points towards their final tally.

AtlasBX Motorsports won the teams' championship to add to the three titles they won in 2017, 2018 and 2019.

Notes:
 – Driver did not finish the round, but was classified as they completed more than 75% of the race distance.

References

External links 
 

Motorsport in South Korea
Sports car racing series
Touring car racing series
Superrace Championship